Boun Oum Airways or BOA, was a Laotian Airline owned by Prince Boun Oum. After 1965 BOA expanded using aircraft on loan from Continental Air Services, Inc (CASI). BOA's aircraft did not carry any logo or titles and their Thai pilots were integrated with CASI by early 1967.

History
The CIA created BOA in 1964 by using resources from both Air America and Bird & Son. BOA was ostensibly owned by Prince Boun Oum of Laos and was created with the intention of flying missions in Laos with Asian crews (as opposed to Caucasian crews) allegedly for plausible deniability. BOA was based at Savannakhet, Laos.

Boum Oum Airlines (sic) reportedly lost two Dornier Do28s on 12/03/67 and in 05/67.

Due to its high aircraft loss rate, BOA was fully integrated into the CASI by mid-1967 and ceased to officially exist.

Incidents
 November 1964, a Bell 47G-3B-1 Sioux helicopter crashed on its first mission.
 December 1965, a C-47 crashed after takeoff from Vientiane. 
 April 1966, a C-47 disappeared while dropping supplies near Ban Song, a town in Surat Thani Province, Thailand.
 In 1967, a Do-28 flown by a CASI pilot, C.V. Stone crashed into a hangar on take-off.
 May 1967, a Dornier Do-28s was lost in a heavy rainstorm near Mahaxay, Laos, while dropping supplies.

Aircraft

Beech Tradewind x 1
Bell 47G-3B-1 x 1
Dornier Do 28 x 2
Douglas C-47s x 2
Helio Courier x 1
Piper PA-18 Super Cubs x 2

References

Further reading
 Kenneth Conboy and Don Greer, War in Laos 1954-1975, Squadron/Signal Publications, Inc., Carrollton, Texas 1994. 
 Kenneth Conboy with James Morrison, Shadow War: The CIA's Secret War in Laos, Boulder CO: Paladin Press, 1995. 
 Kenneth Conboy and Simon McCouaig, The War in Laos 1960-75, Men-at-arms series 217, Osprey Publishing Ltd, London 1989. 
 Roger Warner, Shooting at the Moon: The Story of America's Clandestine War in Laos, South Royalton VE: Steerforth Press, 1996.

External links
 BOA at Air-America.net

Defunct airlines of Laos
Airlines established in 1965
Airlines disestablished in 1967
Central Intelligence Agency front organizations
Defunct helicopter airlines
Vietnam War
Military history of Laos